Kendrapara Road railway station is a railway station on the East Coast Railway network in the state of Odisha, India. It serves Kendrapara Road. Its code is KNPR. It has two platforms. Passenger, MEMU, Express trains halt at Kendrapara Road railway station.

Major trains
 East Coast Express

See also
 Cuttack district

References

Railway stations in Cuttack district
Khurda Road railway division